Joanne Goh  is a Malaysian film producer and entrepreneur. Joanne started her career in the entertainment industry in 1997, she is the founder of Jazzy Group of Companies, which organizes live concerts; Jazzy Pictures, a film and TV production company based in Malaysia; and the Malaysia International Film Festival and Malaysia Golden Global Awards.

Career

Jazzy Pictures

In 2017, Goh founded Jazzy Pictures (M) Sdn Bhd, a film production and distribution company.

In 2018, along with Pixel Play Entertainment, Goh co-produced Crossroads: One Two Jaga, which won the Best Film in the 30th Malaysia Film Festival and other local awards. The film’s positive reception paved the way for "a new direction for an industry that comes under close government scrutiny when it comes to subject matter, with its themes of corruption and crime". In the same year, Goh produced Fly By Night, which premiered in the 23rd Busan International Film Festival.

In 2019, Goh produced Nina Wu, a film that was a response to and a reflection of the #MeToo movement. Directed by Taiwanese director Midi Z, the film was selected to compete in the 72nd Cannes Film Festival.

Goh's upcoming projects include Warning From Hell, The Lies I Tell, Reborn, Calling From Dark Side.

MIFFest & MGGA 
Established in 2016, Malaysia International Film Festival (MIFFest) and Malaysia Global Golden Awards (MGGA) aim to showcase curated films from all over the world, and to recognize a collection of works selected by a panel of judges who are veterans of the film industry. In an interview with New Straits Times, Goh said that "the purpose of both events is to build a communication platform for global filmmakers and to promote the Malaysian film industry, as well as its arts and culture to the world". Through MiFFest and MGGA, Goh also hopes to promote the Malaysian tourism and arts industries. The festival is supported by the National Film Development Corporation (Finas), Tourism Malaysia and several local film associations.

Fast Forward with Joanne Goh 

In 2020, 'Fast Forward with Joanne Goh' was published. It was a biography about Goh's twenty-three years of experience in the entertainment industry.

Producer filmography

Achievement 

 Jury: Sinag Maynila Independent Film Festival 2019 (Main Competition)
 Jury: Asian World Film Festival 2022
 Honorary Fellow: Lincoln University College

Further reading

Magazine 

 Citta Bella (Malaysia): Bella Feature | Career Queen 娱乐大姐大·Joanne Goh 吴佩玲
 Sisters Magazine (Malaysia): 【人物专访】Joanne Goh：“光与影，我与电影”

Newspaper 

 South China Morning Post: Entertainment guru Joanne Goh rolls out the red carpet for Malaysian films
 The Sun Daily (Malaysia): Appetite for success
 Sin Chew Daily (Malaysia): 巾帼豪杰吴佩玲：我要成为不平凡的人
 Oriental Daily (Malaysia): 重重挑战重重过　吴佩玲活出真我

Radio 

 Melody FM (Malaysia): MELODY 探子回报|第五届MIFFest大马国际电影节回归！

References 

Malaysian film producers
Living people
1975 births